Wirral Grammar School for Girls is an all-girls grammar school on the Wirral Peninsula in Merseyside, England.

Admissions
It is on Heath Road, Bebington, on the Wirral Peninsula, next door to Wirral Grammar School for Boys.  The school consists of lower school (ages 11–16) and Sixth Form (ages 17–18), and entrance is by the 11-plus examination.  Mrs Jenny Ogunmyiwa has been head teacher since September 2022 following the retirement of Mrs Elaine Cogan after 20 years as headteacher.

Consistently high achieving, Wirral Grammar School for Girls has been designated as a "high performing school" by the Specialist Schools Academies Trust and has received an Ofsted rating of 'Outstanding' in every department.

History
It was founded in 1931. It was known as the Wirral County Grammar School for Girls until the late 1990s, being administered by Cheshire County Council before 1974, then by Wirral Metropolitan Borough Council. In the early 1970s, it had around 900 girls.

Academic performance
The school attains some of the best A level results in North West England, coming third for A-Level Points per Pupil in the 2012 Wirral Local Authority area league table.

Notable former pupils

 Anne Baker, historian
 Jean Boht, actress
 Alison McGovern, Labour Member of Parliament for Wirral South (2010 United Kingdom general election–present)
 Sue Nelson, science writer and broadcaster
 Kate Robbins, actress
 Amy Robbins, actress

See also 
 Wirral Grammar School for Boys
 Calday Grange Grammar School
 West Kirby Grammar School
 Bebington High School

References

External links
 EduBase

Grammar schools in the Metropolitan Borough of Wirral
Girls' schools in Merseyside
Educational institutions established in 1931
1931 establishments in England
 
Academies in the Metropolitan Borough of Wirral